
Gmina Proszowice is an urban-rural gmina (administrative district) in Proszowice County, Lesser Poland Voivodeship, in southern Poland.

Villages
Apart from the town of Proszowice, Gmina Proszowice contains the villages and settlements of Bobin, Ciborowice, Czajęcice, Gniazdowice, Górka Stogniowska, Jakubowice, Jazdowiczki, Kadzice, Klimontów, Koczanów, Kościelec, Kowala, Łaganów, Makocice, Mysławczyce, Opatkowice, Ostrów, Piekary, Posiłów, Przezwody, Stogniowice, Szczytniki, Szczytniki-Kolonia, Szklana, Szreniawa, Teresin, Więckowice, Wolwanowice and Żębocin.

Neighbouring gminas
Gmina Proszowice is bordered by the gminas of Igołomia-Wawrzeńczyce, Kazimierza Wielka, Koniusza, Koszyce, Nowe Brzesko, Pałecznica and Radziemice.

References
Polish official population figures 2006

Proszowice
Proszowice County